The members of the 21st General Assembly of Newfoundland were elected in the Newfoundland general election held in November 1908. The general assembly sat from March 30 to April 9, 1909.

The seats were split evenly between the Liberal Party and the new Newfoundland People's Party. Robert Bond resigned as premier after the Governor refused to dissolve the assembly. Edward P. Morris of the People's Party was asked to form a government but  the assembly was unable to choose a speaker and was dissolved.

Although Morris was not able to form a stable government, as Premier, he was able to spend money which helped him gain votes for the election that was to follow.

Sir William MacGregor served as governor of Newfoundland.

Members of the Assembly 
The following members were elected to the assembly in 1904:

Notes:

By-elections 
None.

References 

Terms of the General Assembly of Newfoundland and Labrador